Commonwealth Credit Union is a state chartered credit union headquartered in Frankfort, Kentucky. Commonwealth is regulated under the authority of the National Credit Union Administration (NCUA) of the U.S. federal government. Commonwealth is the second-largest credit union in Kentucky and had $1.27 billion in assets, 103,513 members, and 15 branches as of 2019.

Commonwealth's field of membership extends to anyone residing or working in their 24-county service region. Member deposits are insured up to $250,000 through the National Credit Union Share Insurance Fund, credit unions' equivalent to the Federal Deposit Insurance Corporation (FDIC).

History
Commonwealth Credit Union was founded on April 2, 1951, with $2,700 in assets and 122 members. By 1976, membership had grown to nearly 6,000 and its assets to $2.8 million. Commonwealth absorbed the Kentucky Teachers and Associated Employees Credit Union in 1983.

Commonwealth hosts an annual charity run that benefits charities in Kentucky as well as an annual "Stuff the Bus" campaign to provide local schools with school supplies.

In November 2015, Commonwealth became the preferred credit union partner for the University of Louisville. In 2017, Commonwealth became the official credit union of Rupp Arena.

References

External links
 Official website

Credit unions based in Kentucky
Companies based in Kentucky
Banks established in 1951
1951 establishments in Kentucky